Dinara Galievna Uzbekova (August 22, 1933 in Almetyevsk, Tatarstan, Soviet Union - 2020) was a Russian pharmacologist, Doctor of Medical Sciences, professor at the Ryazan State Medical University, Chairman of the Ryazan Branch of the All-Russian Society of Pharmacologists, Honored Worker of Higher School of the Russian Federation (2012).

She graduated with Honors from Ryazan State Medical University in 1957.

Since 1959, Uzbekova has worked at Ryazan State Medical University:
From 1978 to 1983, Uzbekova headed the Central Research Laboratory.
From 1983 to 1993, Uzbekova headed the Department of Clinical pharmacology.
From 2008 to 2010, Uzbekova headed the Department of Pharmacology.
Since 1994, Uzbekova is curator of apitherapy courses.
She is now a professor Department of Pharmacology at Ryazan State Medical University.

She defended her doctoral dissertation in 1974.

She is a biographer of Nikolai Kravkov.

Works
 D.G. Uzbekova (2003). Evaluation of bee-collected pollen influence on lipid peroxidation, antioxidant system and liver function in old animals
 D.G.Uzbekova (2010). One Hundredth Anniversary of the intravenous anesthesia creation
 DG Uzbekova. At the Origin of the Development of Russian Angiology (Dedicated to the 150 Birthday of Academician N.P. Kravkov). Angiol Sosud Khir 21 (4), 52-55. 2015. 
 DG Uzbekova. Nicolai Kravkov's Pancreotoxine. J Med Biogr. 2016 Jul 13.

References

External links
 https://www.rzgmu.ru/images/files/9/82.pdf (in Russian)

1933 births
Living people
People from Almetyevsk
Russian pharmacologists
Apitherapists
Russian curators
Russian women curators
Russian biographers
Women biographers